Thomas Macgregor Greer (31 January 1853 – 19 February 1928) was a unionist politician in Northern Ireland.

McGreer studied at Trinity College, Dublin, before becoming a solicitor.  He was elected to the first Senate of Northern Ireland as an Ulster Unionist Party member, despite having no political experience, and served for six-and-a-half years.

References

1853 births
1928 deaths
Alumni of Trinity College Dublin
Members of the Senate of Northern Ireland 1921–1925
Members of the Senate of Northern Ireland 1925–1929
Ulster Unionist Party members of the Senate of Northern Ireland